George High School, also known as George Secondary School (Afrikaans: George Sekondêre Skool) is an Afrikaans-medium school in George, a town in the Western Cape province of South Africa. It was established in 1947 .

As of 2006 the school had some 1,266 students and 38 
educators . In 2006 the Western Cape Education Department designated it one of 10 "Arts and Culture focus schools" to be set up over the following three years. 

Schools in the Western Cape
1947 establishments in South Africa
Afrikaans-language schools
High schools in South Africa